The 2004 Frankfurt Galaxy season was the 12th season for the franchise in the NFL Europe League (NFLEL). The team was led by head coach Mike Jones in his first year, and played its home games at Waldstadion in Frankfurt, Germany. They finished the regular season in second place with a record of seven wins and three losses. In World Bowl XII, Frankfurt lost to the Berlin Thunder 30–24.

Offseason

Free agent draft

Personnel

Staff

Roster

Schedule

Standings

Game summaries

Week 1: vs Amsterdam Admirals

Week 2: at Cologne Centurions

Week 3: vs Rhein Fire

Week 4: at Amsterdam Admirals

Week 5: vs Cologne Centurions

Week 6: at Scottish Claymores

Week 7: vs Scottish Claymores

Week 8: vs Berlin Thunder

Week 9: at Rhein Fire

Week 10: at Berlin Thunder

World Bowl XII

Notes

References

Frankfurt
NFL Europe season
Frankfurt Galaxy seasons